The golden-collared tanager (Iridosornis jelskii) is a species of bird in the family Thraupidae.
It is found in Bolivia and Peru.
Its natural habitat is subtropical or tropical moist montane forests.

References

golden-collared tanager
Birds of the Yungas
golden-collared tanager
Taxonomy articles created by Polbot